Kahachi Miliuk is a populated place situated in Pima County, Arizona, United States. It is located in the Fresnal Canyon on the Tohono O'odham Indian Reservation, and its name is derived from the three O'odham words: ge, aji, and meliwkud, meaning "big", "skinny" and "place where runners end a race" (or "finish line").

References

Populated places in Pima County, Arizona